"Super Rich Kids" is a song by American singer Frank Ocean featuring rap vocals from Earl Sweatshirt, and the fifth single from Ocean's debut studio album, Channel Orange. It was first performed live by Ocean in 2011 and then on his Channel Orange Tour in 2012. The single was released in March 2013. The song is in the style of R&B and neo soul, and includes references to and samples of the songs "Bennie and the Jets" by Elton John, "Got to Give It Up" by Marvin Gaye, and "Real Love" by Mary J. Blige. It addresses young, wealthy characters' ennui and fears of the financial crisis with dry humor. The song received positive reviews and charted on the Billboard R&B Songs chart and the UK singles and R&B chart. The song also appeared on the TV show Gossip Girl and the film The Bling Ring.

Background
"Super Rich Kids" was written by Frank Ocean, Malay, Earl Sweatshirt, Kirk Robinson, Nathaniel Robinson Jr., Roy Hammond, Mark Morales and Mark Rooney and produced by Malay. Ocean and Malay came up with "Super Rich Kids" on their first day working together on Ocean's debut album, Channel Orange. According to Ocean, the 2000 film Traffic was an inspiration for the song. Ocean first performed the song during his debut solo tour in 2011, and later performed it on the Channel Orange Tour. The single release was originally announced on January 23, 2013. It was released in the United Kingdom on March 11, and in the United States on the 17th.

Composition

Music
"Super Rich Kids" is an R&B and neo soul ballad set in common time and a slow half-time groove tempo of 60 beats per minute. The key the song was composed in is E♭ major, with a chord progression of D#maj9−C#6−C#maj9−Fm11−G#dim9 followed throughout the song. The song includes a piano part that references the thumping piano line of Elton John's 1973 song "Bennie and the Jets", and horns and synth arpeggios are also present. According to The Quietus, "a stomping piano and the steady smack of kickdrum anchors the ghostly crowd noise from a vast débutantes ball, as the synths quiver both nauseously and as subtly as candle-smoke in a floor draft."

Lyrics
"Super Rich Kids" addresses young, wealthy characters' ennui and fears of the financial crisis with dry humor. The song's chorus takes its lyrics and melody from Mary J. Blige's "Real Love". The track includes a verse from Earl Sweatshirt, which, according to Complex, is a reminder of Ocean as "OFWGKTA at the end of the day." Paste magazine said that "Earl's low verses push Ocean way up into his vocal range."

According to Sound and Motion magazine, the track

"Super Rich Kids" is described by Muso's Guide as "a contemporary version of a Jay McInerney novel," and by The Independent as "something Carole King knocked out in the 1970s." HipHopDX.com said that "at no point are the lyrics judgemental. If anything they’re compassionate." The song also takes samples from Marvin Gayes "Got to Give It Up", and a reference to the 1970s sitcom Good Times (the "Dy-no-mite!" catchphrase of the character J.J. Evans).

Critical reception
The single received acclaim from critics. Sound and Motion magazine said that it "could easily be listened to repeatedly or just set on in the background for an evening's entertainment." Muso's Guide said the song "could be viewed as one of those tail end singles from a brilliant album that doesn't stand strong on its own (Can anyone remember 'Until The End of Time' from FutureSex/LoveSounds or 'Broken-Hearted Girl' from I am ... Sasha Fierce?). Ocean, proving his talent as a songwriter, and a jaded voice for this frustrated introspective generation is able to find something profound from a superficial world." The song became an Editor's Pick on djbooth.net.

Critical reactions of the song in reviews of Channel Orange were also positive. Time called the track a "stand out, tying together the album’s two themes of class and love." Billboard, in a track-by-track review, said that "the steadiness of the beat is immediately familiar but wholly fresh – it's like Ocean snatched 'Benny and the Jets' and threw the composition down a trap door into another universe." No Ripcord said that "it's so incongruous against the crass commercialism and consuming greed that pervades so much of popular culture that it's astonishing."

Complex listed Earl Sweatshirt's appearance in the song number 15 on their "25 Best Guest Verses of 2012".

In other media
The song appeared on the Gossip Girl episode "Monstrous Ball", along with four other Frank Ocean tracks: "Lost", "Pyramids", "Sweet Life" and "Thinkin Bout You". The song also appears as the seventeenth track on the soundtrack for the film The Bling Ring and on the HBO miniseries Big Little Lies. The song was also covered by Misha B.

Lawsuit
In 2014, record label TufAmerica filled a copyright lawsuit against Vivendi and Universal Music Group for the sampling of Mary J. Blige's "Real Love" in "Super Rich Kids". This was because, according to the lawsuit, the sample included a sample of "Impeach the President".

Charts

Weekly charts

Certifications

References

2013 singles
2013 songs
Def Jam Recordings singles
Frank Ocean songs
Songs written by Frank Ocean
Songs written by Malay (record producer)
Songs written by Earl Sweatshirt
Neo soul songs
Songs written by Kirk Robinson